Betws-y-Coed is the name of an electoral ward in the southwest of Conwy County Borough, Wales. It covers its namesake community of Betws-y-Coed, as well as the neighbouring communities of Dolwyddelan and Capel Curig.

According to the 2011 UK Census the population of the ward was 1,244.

County council elections
The ward elects a county councillor to Conwy County Borough Council and, at the May 2017 election, the seat was won by Liz Roberts for Plaid Cymru. Cllr Roberts first won the seat as an Independent candidate in May 2004, subsequently being elected on the Plaid Cymru ticket at the following election in May 2008.

See also
 List of places in Conwy County Borough (categorised)

References

Betws-y-Coed
Wards of Conwy County Borough